WWT may refer to:

 Wastewater treatment
 Wildfowl & Wetlands Trust
 WorldWide Telescope
 Newtok Airport, with IATA code WWT
 World Wide Technology